The Europe/Africa Zone was one of the three zones of the regional Davis Cup competition in 1998.

In the Europe/Africa Zone there were four different tiers, called groups, in which teams competed against each other to advance to the upper tier. The top two teams in Group IV advanced to the Europe/Africa Zone Group III in 1999. All other teams remained in Group IV.

Participating nations

Draw
 Venue: Ndola Tennis Club, Ndola, Zambia
 Date: 6–10 May

  and  promoted to Group III in 1999.

Results

Zambia vs. Ethiopia

Algeria vs. Liechtenstein

Zambia vs. Iceland

Ethiopia vs. Liechtenstein

Algeria vs. Ethiopia

Iceland vs. Liechtenstein

Zambia vs. Liechtenstein

Algeria vs. Iceland

Zambia vs. Algeria

Ethiopia vs. Iceland

References

External links
Davis Cup official website

Davis Cup Europe/Africa Zone
Europe Africa Zone Group IV